Peter Gabriel Neumann (born 1932) is a computer-science researcher who worked on the Multics operating system in the 1960s. He edits the RISKS Digest columns for ACM Software Engineering Notes and Communications of the ACM. He founded ACM SIGSOFT and is a Fellow of the ACM, IEEE, and AAAS.

Early life and education
Neumann holds three degrees from Harvard University: a A.B. in Mathematics, 1954; and a S.M. (1955) and Ph.D. (1961) in Applied Mathematics and Science. He held a Fulbright scholarship in Germany from 1958–1960.

While a student at Harvard, he had a two-hour breakfast with Albert Einstein, on 8 November 1952, discussing simplicity in design.

Career
Neumann worked at Bell Labs from 1960 to 1970. He has worked at SRI International in Menlo Park, California since 1971.

Before the RISKS mailing list, Neumann was known for the Provably Secure Operating System (PSOS).

Neumann worked with Dorothy E. Denning in the 1980s to develop a computer intrusion detection system known as IDES that was a model for later computer security software.

Memberships and awards
Neumann has long served as moderator of RISKS Digest and is a member of the ACCURATE project.

Neumann is the founding editor of ACM Software Engineering Notes (SEN), and is a Fellow of the ACM.

In 2018, Neumann received the EPIC Lifetime Achievement Award from Electronic Privacy Information Center.

Selected publications
 Neumann, Peter G., Computer-Related Risks, Addison-Wesley/ACM Press, 1995.

References

External links
 Home page
 Short biography
 RISKS Forum archive
 Peter G. Neumann oral history, Charles Babbage Institute, University of Minnesota
 

1932 births
Living people
Harvard School of Engineering and Applied Sciences alumni
American computer scientists
Fellows of the Association for Computing Machinery
Fellow Members of the IEEE
Fellows of the American Association for the Advancement of Science
Multics people
Computer security specialists
Scientists at Bell Labs
SRI International people
Computer science writers
Fulbright alumni